Stanley Hardy was an English professional footballer who played in the Football League for Newcastle United as an inside left. He later managed Nottingham Forest.

Personal life 
At the time he enlisted in the British Army during the First World War, Hardy was living in Jesmond. He served in the Royal Northumberland Fusiliers and the Machine Gun Corps during the war and achieved the rank of lieutenant. Hardy was discharged after being gassed on the Western Front. He was related to footballer Sam Hardy.

Career statistics

Player

Manager

References

External links 
 

Stan Hardy at leaguemanagers.com

1890 births
Footballers from Newcastle upon Tyne
English footballers
Year of death missing
Newcastle United F.C. players
British Army personnel of World War I
Royal Northumberland Fusiliers soldiers
Military personnel from Newcastle upon Tyne
Machine Gun Corps officers
Association football inside forwards
English Football League players
English Football League managers
English football managers
Nottingham Forest F.C. managers